Udara akasa, the white hedge blue, is a small butterfly found in India that belongs to the lycaenids or blues family.

Description
Male upperside, forewing: black; a medial triangular area that extends from base outwards to the disc white, suffused at base and anteriorly with iridescent blue that spreads upwards on to the black of the costa; along the dorsum the black ground colour is much paler, in most specimens diffuse fuscous. Hindwing: white, basal third and costal margin broadly suffused with fuscous, the fuscous at base posteriorly overlaid with iridescent blue; a subterminal series of fuscous-black dots and a distinct but very slender black anteciliary line. Underside: white very slightly tinged with bluish; markings all fuscous black, minute and very slender. Forewing: a short discocellular line followed by on anteriorly, strongly curved, discal series of very short detached lines and a more or less obsolescent transverse series of subterminal dots. Hindwing: three subbasal dots in transverse order; a short line on the discocellulars; a spot below the middle of the costa with a smaller spot below it; a posterior discal irregular sinuous series of five or six minute spots and a perfectly regular subterminal series of similar spots. Cilia of both forewings and hindwings white. Antennae, head, thorax and abdomen blackish, the antennae ringed with white; beneath: the palpi, thorax and abdomen snow-white.

Female: Very similar. Upperside: the white area much more extended on both forewings and hindwings. On the former it spreads well into the cell, the latter three-fourths of the wing are white; the dusky basal and costal areas much more restricted than in the male. The iridescent blue suffusion is in many specimens entirely absent, in a few very faintly indicated; the subterminal series of black dots so distinct in the male are generally faint and obsolescent. Underside: as in the male but the markings less distinct. Antennae, head, thorax and abdomen as in the male.

Range
It is found in Sri Lanka, Western Ghats and Malaya.

See also
List of butterflies of India (Lycaenidae)

References

Butterflies of Asia
Udara
Butterflies